"Shelter Me" is a song by American glam metal band Cinderella. It serves as the lead single from the band's third studio album, Heartbreak Station. It peaked at #36 on the Billboard Hot 100.

Music video
The music video features appearances by  Little Richard, Shelley Duvall, Pamela Anderson, Dweezil Zappa, and Harry Shearer.

The video was named on the New York Times list of the 15 Essential Hair-Metal Videos.

Charts

References

1990 songs
Cinderella (band) songs
Songs written by Tom Keifer
Mercury Records singles